Up the Dose is the second and final album by the five-piece Orlando metal group Skrape. It was released on January 13, 2004, after initially being scheduled for a September 2003 release.

Reception
Allmusic's Johnny Loftus gave the album two and a half stars, stating that it tries to "build fully on the promise of "Goodbye" and "Kill Control" from 2001's New Killer America, tracks that cracked the nu-metal mold with stratospheric vocals from Billy Keeton and slight twinges of Deftones psychedelics." He praised the song "Syrup", calling it an "atmospheric later-album track that leaves plenty of empty space around its spidery guitars and plodding percussion, capitalizing the chorus when it finally lurches into gear. The song slides in the slime between early Soundgarden and modern metal, and its final, aggressive tempo change only makes it more effective."

Ink19.com's Nick Plante referred to the album as "the heavy metal equivalent of Kelly Clarkson", writing "It’s formulaic, hook-heavy modern metal where as much input came from RCA’s marketing department as did from the musicians themselves." 
The Orlando Sentinel gave the album a similarly mixed review, noting "These songs sound awfully familiar, despite all the talk from singer Billy Keeton and his Skrape cohorts about how the band is pushing boundaries on its sophomore album. Instead, Orlando's homegrown major-label addition to the nu-metal aesthetic is back with a predictable though solid regurgitation of the power chords and angst of 2001's New Killer America."

Track listing
 "Bleach" – 3:20
 "Stand Up (Summer Song)" – 3:53
 "Up the Dose" – 3:10
 "In the End" – 2:57
 "My Life" – 2:55
 "I Can't Breathe" – 4:51
 "The Ocean" – 4:02
 "Searching for Home" – 3:18
 "Syrup" – 4:39
 "Habit" – 3:42
 "No Respect" – 3:02

The Japanese version of the album includes a bonus track called "You Got What You Wanted". Other songs from the recording sessions are called "Determination" and "So Many Things" which have surfaced online.

References

2004 albums
Skrape albums
RCA Records albums
Albums produced by James Barton (producer)